Dave Stockton Jr. (born July 31, 1968) is an American professional golfer who played on the PGA Tour and the Nationwide Tour.

Stockton joined the Nationwide Tour in 1993 and won two events in his rookie year, the Nike Connecticut Open and the Nike Hawkeye Open. He went through qualifying school and earned his PGA Tour card for 1994. In his rookie year on the PGA Tour he finished 96th on the money list while recording three top-10 finishes including finishing in a tie for third twice. The following year he recorded his best finish on the PGA Tour when he finished in a tie for second at the Canon Greater Hartford Open. He finished 124th on the money list, just good enough to retain his card. In 1996 he finished 120th on the money list while recording two top-10 finishes. 1997 was his first down year on Tour, he finished 146th on the money list, only good enough to retain part-time status on Tour. In 1998 he finished 132nd on the money list but got his Tour card for the following year by going through qualifying school for the second time. In 1999 he struggled to finish in the top 125 again and earned his Tour card through qualifying school for the third time. He finished 140th on the money list in 2000 so he was only able to play part-time in 2001. He returned to the Nationwide Tour in 2002 and then earned his Tour card for 2003 through qualifying school for the fourth time. He didn't have a good year on Tour and returned to the Nationwide Tour in 2004, his final year on Tour.

Stockton is currently a golf instructor at Oak Valley Golf Club in Beaumont, California. His father, Dave Stockton, won the PGA Championship in 1970 and 1976 and was also the United States Ryder Cup captain in 1991.

Professional wins (2)

Buy.com Tour wins (2)

Buy.com Tour playoff record (0–1)

See also
1993 PGA Tour Qualifying School graduates
1998 PGA Tour Qualifying School graduates
1999 PGA Tour Qualifying School graduates
2002 PGA Tour Qualifying School graduates

External links

American male golfers
USC Trojans men's golfers
PGA Tour golfers
Golfers from California
People from Redlands, California
1968 births
Living people